Garage is a former New Zealand 24-hour linear subscription television channel dedicated to action and adventure sports programming on the Sky TV platform.

History
On 4 May 2015, it was announced that Garage would replace Juice TV on Sky TV effective 15 May 2015.

15 November 2015 the channel owner Garage Entertainment Aust Pty Ltd was acquired by SurfStitch Group Limited. SurfStich in the acquisition statement displayed their ambitions to expand the Garage TV channel to Australia and Asian markets.

In April 2017, Madman Media Group announced it had purchased Garage Entertainment from SurfStitch Group for "a nominal cash consideration".

The channel closed on 31 July 2017 at 23:59. The brand continues to be used by Madman as a monthly streaming service revolving around extreme sports.

References

External links
 

Television channels in New Zealand
Defunct television channels in New Zealand
Sports television networks in New Zealand
Television channels and stations established in 2015
English-language television stations in New Zealand
2015 establishments in New Zealand
Television channels and stations disestablished in 2017
2017 disestablishments in New Zealand